Fabricio Formiliano (born 14 January 1993) is a Uruguayan professional footballer who plays as a centre-back for Liga MX club Necaxa.

Honours 
Danubio
 Uruguayan Primera División: 2013–14

Peñarol
Uruguayan Primera División: 2017, 2018

Uruguay U-23
Pan American Games: 
Champion : 2015

References

External links 
 

1993 births
Living people
Sportspeople from Salto, Uruguay
Uruguayan footballers
Uruguay under-20 international footballers
Uruguayan expatriate footballers
Danubio F.C. players
Newell's Old Boys footballers
Peñarol players
Argentine Primera División players
Expatriate footballers in Argentina
Pan American Games gold medalists for Uruguay
Footballers at the 2015 Pan American Games
Pan American Games medalists in football
Association football defenders
Medalists at the 2015 Pan American Games